Cyphothyris ophryodes is a moth in the family Cosmopterigidae. It was described by Edward Meyrick in 1914. It is found in New Guinea and Sri Lanka.

References

Natural History Museum Lepidoptera generic names catalog

Scaeosophinae
Moths described in 1914
Taxa named by Edward Meyrick